Vio or VIO may refer to:

Vio

 Vio (drink), a flavoured milk and carbonated water beverage produced by the Coca-Cola Company
 Vio (flavoured milk), a later version of the above beverage, produced by the Coca-Cola Company in India
 Vio (surname)
 Vio, a 3D photorealistic rendering package for Caddie

VIO
 Venezuela Information Office, a lobbying agency based in the U.S.
 Viohalco, a Greek heavy industry corporation with stock symbol VIO
  Vehicles In Operation

See also
 VIOS (disambiguation)